Josiane Zerubia is a French researcher. She is a "Directeur de Recherche" (English: senior research scientist) at the French Institute for Research in Computer Science and Automation, Université Côte d'Azur. Zerubia has made contributions in stochastic models applied to remote sensing. She has been the team leader of numerous research teams such as Ayana (2020-2024), Ayin (2012-2016), Ariana (1998-2011) or Pastis (1995-1997). She has been professor at the Institut supérieur de l'aéronautique et de l'espace from 1999 to 2020.

Education
Zerubia did a postdoc at the Signal and Image Processing Institute of the University of Southern California. She also worked as a researcher for the Laboratoire de Signaux et Systèmes (Université de Nice/French National Centre for Scientific Research) from 1984 to 1988 and in the Hewlett Packard France and Hewlett Packard Labs from 1982 to 1984.

She received her MSc degree from the Department of Electrical Engineering at École nationale supérieure d'ingénieurs électriciens de Grenoble in 1981, the Doctor of Engineering degree, her PhD and her "Habilitation", in 1986, 1988, and 1994 respectively, all from the Université Nice-Sophia-Antipolis (nowadays Université Côte-d'Azur).

Work
Zerubia is a permanent research scientist at INRIA since 1989.

She created and is the head of the "Ayana" exploratory research group, which is an interdisciplinary project using knowledge in stochastic modeling, image processing, artificial intelligence, remote sensing, and embedded electronics/computing.

Awards and honors
IGARSS Best Student Paper Award and IEEE GRSS Mikio Takagi Student Prize (co-author) in 2021
Prize of Excellence from University of Côte d'Azur (2016, 2019, 2020)
IAPR Fellow (2020)
Doctor Honoris Causa from University of Szeged in Hungary (2020)
EURASIP Fellow (2019)
IEEE Signal Processing Society Distinguished Lecturer (2016-2017)
IEEE Geoscience and Remote Sensing Society (Europe section) best PhD thesis prize (co-advisor, in collaboration with LIAMA, CAS, Beijing) (2008)
EUSIPCO Best Young Author Paper Award (co-author) in 2004
IEEE Fellow (2003)
Chevalier de l'Ordre National du Mérite (proposed by the French Minister of Research in 2002)
British Council fellowship in 1997 (University of Cambridge, Trinity College & Eng. Dept.)
2 Fellowships of the French Committee of Physics at École Polytechnique in 1987 (stay in Beijing) and in 1988 (stay in New York)
IBM Academic and Research fellowship (1987)
Rotary Youth Leadership Award (1982)
Prize of the Société d'Entraide de la Légion d'Honneur (1978)
Prix de la Résistance et de la déportation from the city of Antibes (1974)

Selected bibliography

Articles
N.B.: the list of Josiane Zerubia's publications is available from her home page.

Books

References

French National Centre for Scientific Research scientists
French electrical engineers
Fellow Members of the IEEE
Côte d'Azur University alumni
University of Southern California alumni

Year of birth missing (living people)
Living people